Uranotaenia (Pseudoficalbia) bicolor is a species of mosquito belonging to the genus Uranotaenia. It is found in Thailand, Sri Lanka, Cambodia, China, India, Indonesia, Malaysia, Nepal, Philippines and Vietnam.

References

External links
Species Details : Uranotaenia bicolor Leicester, 1908

bicolor
Insects described in 1908